Freestyle Script is an informal display script typeface that was designed by Colin Brignall in 1969 and Martin Wait in 1981, by Letraset. Freestyle Script is famously used for commercials in 1980s, birthday cards, decorative, logos and many others. The bold version was designed in 1986. The publishers of this font are Adobe, ITC, Monotype Imaging, Elsner+Flake, Esselte Corporation, Scangraphic Type, Linotype, Image Club, and Letraset. This font has few versions, namely Regular, Bold, LT, Plain, LET, EF, SB, SH, SH Reg Alt, and SB Reg Alt. Freestyle Script font supports up to 78 different languages for cursive (plain) and 33 different languages for other styles (Regular, Bold, Alt, etc.). The Cyrillic version of Freestyle Script was created in 1993, consisting of the glyphs in Latin supplement. The font has been included in MyFonts since 2000.

History 
Freestyle Script was first designed by Colin Brignall in 1969 and then by Martin Wait in 1981 for regular and cursive font. The bold version was released in 1986, which several of its digital versions lack proper weight. In 1993, the fonts similar to Freestyle Script in all glyphs are called "VI My Ha Hoa" and "VI My Ha." Those fonts are all caps and designed by VISCII Fonts in 1993. URW++ used to have a version named URW Fresnel in 1996, and it is similar to this font. SG Freestyle Script's SB Regular Alternative is also available but some letters are different from original Freestyle Script. In 2003, the Freestyle Script font was added to Microsoft Word, and it is continued with succeeding versions such as Word 2007, Word 2010, Word 2013, Word 2016 and Word 2019. The font is in TrueType font format.

Reception

Opposition
The font Bradley Hand and other handwritten fonts (including Freestyle Script) were banned in the website Webdesigner Depot in 2010. It was ranked eight among the top banned fonts. Those banned fonts, including Freestyle Script, were said to be "annoying". They are used in party invitations and gift shop signage.

In February 19, 2011, Brittany Sangastiano banned 40 fonts, including Freestyle Script, as reported by BuzzFeed. In March 8, 2018, the website  Illumine 8 described Freestyle Script as Adobe's way to fool that the font is handwritten and it leaves ugly gaps. Illumine 8 ranked Freestyle Script as the fourteenth worst handwritten font in the first round of voting. Freestyle Script was not included in the following rounds. In all banning made for Freestyle Script typeface, the banners of this typeface that they did not know, there are also better versions that made suitable for any common typographies like "Plain" and other similar to that style. There are no evidences yet from any typography experts that Freestyle Script is officially banned as those were only a defamation from an original designer.

Glyph duplications to other typefaces

Because of some oppositions from the typographists for Freestyle Script typeface, there are typefaces that duplicates some of the glyphs that infringe copyright from original designers of this typeface (as there are no official permit from any company that own it), like and Photoshoot that showed on some glyphs that were allegedly the inspiration of some techniques for Freestyle Script typeface. There are typefaces that legitimately made even there are similarities on glyphs and are open source like Yellowtail.

Name duplications

There is a faux calligraphy typeface called "Freestyle" (alternately "Freestyle Script" faux calligraphy typeface) that could confuse many graphic designers who use Microsoft to search or download a particular typeface. It was first listed on August 23, 2016, and the typeface costs US$14 lower (that duplicate typeface name costs US$15) than the original typeface that can be seen at MyFonts. There is another typeface used the same name (alternately "Freestyle Script" brush calligraphy typeface) that could also confuse graphic designers to the original typeface name. The designers however, did answer the comment yet why that name are they used than changing to the other name. In reality, those typeface designers are about to confuse people who are using the original Freestyle Script typeface to force its downfall to the original owner that designed the typeface.

Defense
 In the blog site The Creative Hustler: Freestyle Script was ranked as 29th of the best cursive fonts.
 In Allfonts.co: Freestyle Script included as the one of the best cursive fonts for the year 2021. "It is not like the traditional handwritten fonts, and has separated characters. It is a handwritten typeface that captures the essence of handwriting without the unnecessary extras.", the writer of this article said.

Gallery
Versions comparison of Freestyle Script:

References 

Typefaces
Script typefaces